The Last Supper is a 2006 American short comedy film about the Biblical Last Supper, depicted as having occurred at a contemporary nightclub. The film was directed by Marius A. Markevicius and stars Chip Bent, Michael Bortone, Eliza Dushku, Andrew Davoli and Isaiah Mustafa.

The Last Supper premiered in September 2006 at the San Diego Film Festival.

Cast
Chip Bent as JC
Michael Bortone as Judas
Isaiah Mustafa as Moses
Eliza Dushku as Waitress
Ryan Krause as Lazarus
Seth Garfunkel as Parental Peter
Chris Andrew Giulla as Assuming Andrew
Brad Pennington as Curious James
Dave Power as Loud Guy John
Nate Dushku as Quoting Philip
Andrew Davoli as Metro Bartholomew
Wyatt Russell as Doubting Thomas
Luke Franco as Pent Up Matthew
Jason Markarian as Instigating James
Sebastian Hinton as Insecure Thaddaeas
Paul Rae as Simon

References

External links

Last Supper
2006 short films
2006 films
2000s fantasy comedy films
American comedy short films
Portrayals of Jesus in film
2006 comedy films
2000s English-language films